Eoh or EOH may refer to:

Linguistics 
 Ehwaz or Eoh (ᛖ), meaning "horse", a rune
 Eihwaz or Ēoh (ᛇ), meaning "yew", a rune
 ㅓ, one of the Korean hangul

Other uses 
 Earlville Opera House, in New York, United States
 Excise, Overhead, Handling
 Olaya Herrera Airport, in Medellín, Colombia
 EOH Holdings, a South African technology company